Canada participated in the 2011 Parapan American Games.

Medalists

Archery

Canada sent two male and one female athlete to compete.

Athletics

Canada sent thirteen male and six female athletes to compete.

Boccia

Canada sent ten male and three female athletes to compete.

Cycling

Canada sent eleven male and seven female athletes to compete. Eight male and six female athletes competed in the road cycling tournament, while three male athletes and one female athlete competed in the track cycling tournament.

Goalball

Canada sent two teams of six athletes each to compete in the men's and women's tournaments.

Judo

Canada sent three male athletes to compete.

Sitting volleyball

Canada sent a team of eleven athletes to compete.

Swimming

Canada sent twelve male and nine female swimmers to compete.

Table tennis

Canada sent four male athletes and one female athlete to compete.

Wheelchair basketball

Canada sent two teams of twelve athletes to compete in the men's and women's tournaments.

Wheelchair tennis

Canada sent two male athletes to compete.

Nations at the 2011 Parapan American Games
2011 in Canadian sports
Canada at the Pan American Games